The Ruthless Four is a 1968 Western film directed by Giorgio Capitani and starring Van Heflin.

Cast
 Van Heflin as Sam Cooper
 Gilbert Roland as Mason
 Klaus Kinski as Brent the Blonde
 George Hilton as Manolo Sanchez
 Sarah Ross as Anna
 Federico Boido (as Rick Boyd)
 Sergio Doria
 Giovanni Ivan Scratuglia (as Ivan Scratuglia)
 Giorgio Gruden
 Hardy Reichelt
 Teodoro Corrà (as Doro Corra)

Release
The Ruthless Four was released in West Germany on 6 August 1968 as Das Gold von Sam Cooper.

References

External links

The Ruthless Four movie online at AMCtv.com

1968 films
1968 drama films
1968 Western (genre) films
1960s adventure drama films
1960s Italian-language films
Spaghetti Western films
Films directed by Giorgio Capitani
Films scored by Carlo Rustichelli
Films about mining
Films shot in Almería
1960s Italian films